William Allan may refer to:

Politicians
George William Allan (1822–1901), Canadian politician
George William Allan (Manitoba politician) (1860–1940), Canadian politician
William Allan (banker) (c. 1770–1853), Canadian banker, businessman and politician
William Allan (English politician) (1837–1903), Liberal Party politician in the United Kingdom
William Allan (Queensland politician) (1840–1901), pastoralist and politician in Queensland, Australia

Others
William Allan (British Army officer) (1832–1918)
William Allan (classicist) (born 1970), Scottish classicist
William Allan (geneticist) (1881–1943), American physician and geneticist
William Allan (painter) (1782–1850), Scottish historical painter
William Allan (trade unionist) (1813–1874), British trade unionist
William Evan Allan (1899–2005), Australian military figure, seeing service in WWI and WWII
William Allan of Glen (1788–1868), Lord Provost of Edinburgh
William Allan (footballer), several people

See also
Bill Allen (disambiguation)
Will Allen (disambiguation)
William Allen (disambiguation)
William FitzAlan, Lord of Oswestry (c. 1105–1160), Norman noble
William Van Alen (1883–1954), American architect
Norman Thomas William Allan, known as Bill, former Australian (N.S.W.) police commissioner